Armenia is a municipality in the Sonsonate department of El Salvador. The municipality has a population of around 14,997.

History

The name of this town was originally "Guaymoco" in ancient Pipil dialect of Nahuat and means "the oratory of the frogs".

The current mayor is Carlos Rivera Molina (ARENA). Molina was first elected in 2002, taking the place of Moises Alvarado of the FMLN, and was re-elected to a second term in March 2006.

Sports
The local professional football clubs are named C.D. Salvadoreño and Rácing Junior and they both currently play in the Salvadoran Third Division.

References

External links
Finding the Armenians of Central America

Municipalities of the Sonsonate Department